Seferović is a Bosnian surname. Notable people with the surname include:

Haris Seferovic (born 1992), Swiss footballer
Matic Seferović (born 1986), Slovenian footballer
Sead Seferović (born 1970), Bosnian footballer

Bosnian surnames
Patronymic surnames